China Illustrata is the 1667 published book written by the Jesuit Athanasius Kircher (1602–1680) that compiles the 17th-century European knowledge on the Chinese Empire and its neighboring countries. The original Latin title is Athanasii Kircheri e Soc. Jesu China monumentis, qua sacris qua profanis, nec non variis Naturae et artis spectaculis, aliarumque rerum memorabilium argumentis illustrata, auspiciis Leopoldi primi, Roman. Imper. Semper augusti Munificentissimi Mecaenatis.

Author and publisher 
Athanasius Kircher was a polymath who published around 40 major works in the field of both the humanities and the sciences. He was based at the Jesuits' College in Rome, where he had access to many reports that Chinese-based missionaries sent back to the Jesuits' administrative offices. The accessibility to essential material, as well as Kircher's vast interest in Chinese language and culture, gave the impulse to present the unknown East in one comprehensive volume of 237 pages. The scholar was therefore considered an expert on China, although he had never visited the country.

Kircher's regular publisher, a printing house in Amsterdam run by Janssonius van Waesberge and Elizer Weyerstraten, produced the first copy of his work. In the same year another publisher named Jacob van Meurs brought out a copy of the text. Both editions are almost identical with the same content, pagination, and illustrations.

Reception and significance  

Kircher himself had never been to China, but compiled the oral and written reports of former Jesuit missionaries to publish a summary of the knowledge on China and Tibet collected by Europeans in the 17th century. At that time China Illustrata was successful and got translated into Dutch (1668), English (1669) and French (1670) shortly after the Latin original had been published in 1667. The English version awakened great interest in China and inspired numerous further English publications on far Eastern travels and discoveries.

However, China Illustrata was also criticized.  Gottfried Leibniz described the book as a work of entertainment rather than serious scholarship.  Egyptologist Adolf Erman agreed that Kircher had written a book for the public at large rather than for scholars.

But others argue that China Illustrata was the first and most important writing to shape Western understanding and knowledge of China for over two hundred years.  Indeed, it became one of the most influential and popular books of the 17th century and is even today considered "an important source of information on the beginnings of western sinology and sinophilism in Europe".

Content 
Kircher's work is an encyclopedia about the Chinese empire containing accurate cartography and illustrations that elucidate the vivid descriptions found in the text. The volume is a cultural account of China ranging from religious practices and social customs over languages to China's natural wonders, such as exotic plants and animals. By collecting and compiling information taken from fellow Jesuits including Matteo Ricci, Martino Martini, Johann Adam Schall von Bell, Johann Grueber and Heinrich Roth, Kircher achieves to create an authentic secondary study on Chinese people, nature and mythology.
 
There were several reasons for Kircher to write China Illustrata. First, he wanted to promote the missionaries' work and tell about the great journeys of Europeans in China. Second, he was also driven by his strong personal interest in Chinese language and culture. He collected Chinese objects for display in his museum, a chamber of curiosity in Rome established in 1651 and named Musaeum Kircherianum after Kircher himself.

Apart from describing and illustrating foreign objects and exotic creatures, the book also dwells on relations between China and the West. Kircher connects Western, Indian, Chinese and Japanese Idolatry and tries to prove the evidence of early Christianity in China. His work emphasises Christian elements in Chinese history, starting with the presence of Nestorians in the city of Xi’an. Kircher bases this assumption on the Sino-Syrian monument that was found there in the 8th century. In his interpretation the inscription on the monument is a proof of the first declaration of the Gospel in China.

Kircher also declared that the Chinese script originated from the Egyptian hieroglyphs, since both writing systems were designed on pictorial principles.

Illustrations 
The most important and interesting features of Kircher's book – especially at that time – are numerous illustrations of nature, rare portraits of emperors and Jesuits, and accurate maps of China that are from high cartographical quality. The illustrations of plants and animals are based on Michel Boym's Flora Sinensis and some of the images are derived from Chinese originals.

Illustrations play an important role in most of Kircher's works and they "have a quality of ingenuity and strangeness that are particular to his century". China Illustrata contains a number of realistic depictions of Chinese plants and animals, but also fictitious images, such as the "Dragon and Tiger mountain" (China Illustrata, p. 171) said to be existent in the Orient. Although Kircher himself did not create most of the images, he chose them wisely in order to elucidate the descriptions found in the text.

Chapters 
The book is divided into six sections:

1. Part One explains the meaning and significance of the eighth-century Sino-Syrian monument (42 pages)

2. Part Two tells about various journeys undertaken in China, including the Journey of Marco Polo (78 pages)

3. Part Three claims parallels between Western, Indian, Chinese and Japanese Idolatry (38 pages)

4. Part Four gives descriptions and illustrations of the flora and fauna in China (44 pages)

5. Part Five talks about the architecture and mechanical arts of the Chinese (11 pages)

6. Part Six is concerned with the Chinese language and its relationship with the Hieroglyphic characters (12 pages)

Bibliography 
 https://htext.stanford.edu/content/kircher/china/kircher.pdf (complete English version, translated by Charles D. Van Tuyl from the 1667 -- and not 1677 -- original Latin edition)
 Le meraviglie della Cina, Bologna: Bononia University Press, 2016 (complete Italian version, translated by Biagio Santorelli)

References 

1667 books
Books about China
Jesuit publications
Latin prose texts
17th-century Latin books
Athanasius Kircher